The 1981–82 UAB Blazers men's basketball team represented the University of Alabama at Birmingham as a member of the Sun Belt Conference during the 1981–82 NCAA Division I men's basketball season. This was head coach Gene Bartow's fourth season at UAB, and the Blazers played their home games at BJCC Coliseum. They finished the season 25–6, 9–1 in Sun Belt play and won the Sun Belt tournament. They received an automatic bid to the NCAA tournament as No. 4 seed in the Mideast region. After beating No. 5 seed Indiana in the second round, UAB upset No. 1 seed Virginia to reach the Elite Eight. The Blazers fell to Louisville in the Mideast regional final, 75–68. As of 2021, that is the furthest a UAB men’s team has advanced in NCAA Tournament play.

Roster

Schedule and results

|-
!colspan=9 style=| Regular season

|-
!colspan=9 style=| Sun Belt tournament

|-
!colspan=9 style=| NCAA tournament

Rankings

Awards and honors
Oliver Robinson – Sun Belt Conference Player of the Year, Sun Belt tournament MVP
Gene Bartow – Sun Belt Conference Coach of the Year

NBA Draft

References

UAB Blazers men's basketball seasons
UAB
UAB